The 2005–06 Seattle SuperSonics season was the team's 39th in the NBA. They began the season hoping to improve upon their 52-30 output from the previous season. However, they came seventeen games shy of tying it, finishing 35–47 and failing to qualify for the playoffs.

Draft picks

Roster

Regular season

Standings

Record vs. opponents

Game log

Player statistics

Awards and records

Transactions

References

Seattle SuperSonics seasons